Alan de Tatton Egerton, 3rd Baron Egerton (19 March 1845 – 9 September 1920), known as the Honourable Alan Egerton from 1859 to 1907, was a British Conservative politician from the Egerton family.

Egerton was a younger son of William Egerton, 1st Baron Egerton, and his wife Lady Charlotte Elizabeth Loftus. Wilbraham Egerton, 1st Earl Egerton, was his elder brother. He was elected to the House of Commons for Cheshire Mid in 1883, a seat he held until 1885, when the constituency was abolished, and then represented Knutsford from 1885 to 1906. In 1907 he succeeded his elder brother as third Baron Egerton.

The Hon Alan de Tatton Egerton MP was commissioned as a captain in the Paddington Rifles (later 5th Volunteer Battalion, Rifle Brigade) in 1877, and was later major and honorary lieutenant-colonel in the Cheshire imperial Yeomanry. He was the first president of the Institute of Refrigeration, formed in 1899 as the Cold Storage and Ice Association. He was appointed a deputy lieutenant of the County of Chester 24 December 1901, and Vice-Lieutenant of the county 11 January 1902.

Lord Egerton married Anna Louisa, daughter of Simon Watson Taylor, in 1867. He died in September 1920, aged 75, and was succeeded in the barony by his son Maurice.

References

External links 
 

1845 births
1920 deaths
Barons in the Peerage of the United Kingdom
Alan
Members of the Metropolitan Board of Works
Conservative Party (UK) MPs for English constituencies
Younger sons of barons
UK MPs 1880–1885
UK MPs 1885–1886
UK MPs 1886–1892
UK MPs 1892–1895
UK MPs 1895–1900
UK MPs 1900–1906
UK MPs who inherited peerages
Tatton family